Octantis Mons is a mountain on the planet Mars. The name Octantis Mons is a classical albedo name. It has a diameter of 19.09 km Kilometer. This mountain's definition was approved by International Astronomical Union in 1991.

See also
 List of mountains on Mars

References

External links 
 Gazetteer of Planetary Nomenclature

Mountains on Mars
Argyre quadrangle